The La Brea Fire was a fast moving 2009 wildfire which occurred in Southern California in the United States. The fire began near La Brea Creek in Santa Barbara County, in the Los Padres National Forest. The fire started burning on August 8, and just 5 days later on August 13 had grown by 10,000 acres, or 40 sq. km. When the wildfire was finally contained on August 22, it had burned 89,489 acres (140 sq. mi; 362 sq. km.) of land. The huge Zaca Fire burned in the same region as the La Brea Fire, and occurred just two years prior in 2007.

Containing the Fire 
The fire was first reported on Saturday August 8, 2009 at 2:45 PM in the San Rafael Wilderness Area and grew to a size of 1,300 acres by nightfall. At the start, the fire was located 23 miles east of Santa Maria, and the containment operation was under the command of the leader of the California Interagency Incident Management Team 3, Jeanne Pincha-Tulley.  The first step to their strategy to keep the fire contained was to first implement evacuations of people near the fire and to protect private property and homes.  This allowed the fire to burn unattended in the San Rafael Wilderness.  Once the private property was protected, the fire’s growth in the wilderness began to stall, and the containment crew executed a direct attack plan.  Helicopters dropped water on the fire, heavy air tankers dropped fire retardant, and hotshot crews operated on the ground.  Mechanized equipment was used to cut down enough trees in the area to make places that helicopters could land.  

After two weeks of managing the fire this way, the fire was declared 100% contained at 6 p.m. on August 22, and management of the contained fire was passed off from California Interagency Management Team 3 to Central Coast Interagency Incident Management Team 7, headed by Incident Commander Jim Smith. At least 29 engines, 17 crews, 4 bulldozers, 56 water tenders, 5 aerial firefighting helicopters and 878 firefighters were deployed to fight the blaze.

Cause of the Fire 
After a week-long investigation on the part of United States Forest Service Special Agents, the Santa Barbara County Sheriff’s Narcotics Unit and Fire Investigators announced that the cause of the La Brea Fire was linked to a cooking fire in a marijuana drug operation.  The illegal drug operation was believed to be run by a Mexican National Drug Organization. The illegal marijuana garden where the illegal drug operation was conducted was left unburned by the La Brea Fire, and there were signs of it being occupied shortly before the fire started. Officials were able to find and secure this camp area, and believed that the culprits were still in the San Rafael Wilderness attempting to escape on foot.  As they feared the criminals were nearby, the police warned local citizens not to approach suspicious looking individuals, but instead report them to law enforcement.

See also 
2009 California wildfires

 Jesusita Fire
 Lockeed Fire
 Station Fire
 Guiberson Fire

References

2009 California wildfires
Wildfires in Santa Barbara County, California
August 2009 events in the United States